The 37th Army was an Army-level formation of the Soviet Union during the Second World War. The army was formed twice during the war.  The army was part of the Southern Group of Forces in Romania and Bulgaria.

First formation
The 37th Army first formed on 10 August 1941 in the Southwestern Front with the command group from the Kiev Fortified Region and other reserves in front reserves.

Upon formation, the army took up defensive positions to the west of Kiev and on the left bank of the Dnieper River. During the defense of Kiev the army suffered severe losses against superior German forces. The army was surrounded in the city of Kiev and was ordered to break out on 19 September. Individual units of the army were able to break out and join forces with the front. Many of the other units of the army were destroyed. The army was disbanded on 25 September 1941.

Composition
The army had the following units assigned when formed:
147th Rifle Division
171st Rifle Division
175th Rifle Division
206th Rifle Division
284th Rifle Division
295th Rifle Division
Artillery and other units.

Second Formation
The army was reformed on 15 November 1941 in the Southern Front for a counterattack in the Rostov area against the German 1st Panzer Army. These actions facilitated the 9th and 56th Armies liberation of Rostov-on-Don.  The army took part in the Barvenkovo-Lozovaya Offensive from 18–31 January 1942 with the goal of destroying the German Army in southern Ukraine.

The army conducted defensive operations during the summer and fall of 1942 in reaction to German operations in the Southern Soviet Union.  The army was transferred from the Southern Front to the Don Group of the North Caucasian Front (I Formation) in late July and then the  Transcaucasian Front in August 1942.

As part of the North Caucasian Strategic Offensive in January 1943 the army liberated the towns of Kislovodsk, Pyatigorsk, Essentuki and Cherkessk.  The army was transferred to the North Caucasian Front(II Formation) on 24 January to participate in the Krasnodar Offensive.  In July the army forces were reassigned to the 9th and 56th Armies and the 37th Army was placed under STAVKA control.

On 7 September 1943, the army was assigned to the Steppe Front.  The army took part in the liberation of the Left-bank Ukraine east of Kremenchug.  In late September, it crossed the Dnieper River west of Keleberda and northwest of Mishurin Rog.  The army was involved in offensive operations in the Krivoy Rog area from October to December.

Assigned to the 3rd Ukrainian Front on 15 January 1944.  Participated in the Odessa Offensive in conjunction with the 46th Army.  From 8 August, the army participated in the Jassy–Kishinev Offensive and in September the occupation of Bulgaria. By the end of September, its troops reached the area of Kazanlak, Yambol, and Burgas, where the army's combat history ended. The army remained in Bulgaria as a garrison for the rest of the war, and was redesignated the 37th Separate Army on 15 December.

Composition
The army had the following units assigned when formed:
51st Rifle Division
96th Rifle Division
99th Rifle Division
216th Rifle Division
253rd Rifle Division
295th Rifle Division

Forces assigned on 7 September 1943 upon attachment to the Steppe Front:
57th Rifle Corps
82nd Rifle Corps
53rd Rifle Division

Forces assigned at the end of the war.
34th Rifle Corps
259th Rifle Division
353rd Rifle Division
394th Rifle Division
66th Rifle Corps
195th Rifle Division
244th Rifle Division
333rd Rifle Division
82nd Rifle Corps
28th Guards Rifle Division
92nd Guards Rifle Division
188th Rifle Division
255th Naval Rifle Brigade
35th Antiaircraft Artillery Division
Artillery, tank and engineer units.

Post-war
The army was stationed in Bulgaria with its headquarters at Sofia as part of the Southern Group of Forces from 10 June 1945. It was redesignated as the 10th Mechanized Army on 10 June 1946. It included four divisions: the 2nd Guards, 4th Guards, 19th, and 21st Mechanized Divisions. The 2nd Guards Mechanized Division at Craiova was the former 2nd Guards Mechanized Corps, the 4th Guards Mechanized Division at Sofia was the former 4th Guards Mechanized Corps, the 19th Mechanized Division at Plovdiv was the former 244th Rifle Division. The 21st Mechanized Division at Burgas was the former 223rd Rifle Division. The 21st Mechanized was withdrawn to the Soviet Union in July, leaving the army with only three divisions. The army was disbanded on 15 June 1947, along with its 19th Mechanized Division, after signing the peace treaties with Romania and Bulgaria.

Commanders
The army's first formation was commanded by the following officer:
Major General Andrey Vlasov (July–September 1941)

The army's second formation was commanded by the following officers:
Major General (Promoted to Lieutenant General March 1942) Anton Lopatin (October 1941 – June 1942)
Major General Pyotr Kozlov (June 1942 – May 1943)
Lieutenant General Konstantin Koroteev (May – July 1943)
Major General Alexander Filatov (July – August 1943)
Major General Alexander Ryzhov (August 1943)
Lieutenant General Mikhail Sharokhin (August 1943 – October 1944)
Colonel General Sergey Biryuzov (October 1944 – May 1946)
The 10th Mechanized Army was commanded by the following officers.
 Lieutenant General Ivan Korchagin (12 June – 5 August 1946)
 Colonel General Sergey Biryuzov (August 1946 – 15 June 1947)

References

Citations

Bibliography 

Field armies of the Soviet Union
Military units and formations established in 1941
1941 establishments in the Soviet Union
Wikipedia articles needing cleanup after translation from Russian